The 1965–66 Shell Shield season was the inaugural edition of what is now the Regional Four Day Competition, the domestic first-class cricket competition for the countries of the West Indies Cricket Board (WICB). The tournament was sponsored by Royal Dutch Shell, with matches played from 27 January to 14 March 1966.

Five teams contested the tournament – Barbados, British Guiana, Jamaica, Trinidad and Tobago, and a Combined Islands team (drawn from the Leeward and Windward Islands). Each team played the others once, making for a total of ten matches. Barbados were undefeated during the competition, winning three matches and drawing the other to win the inaugural title. Jamaican batsman Easton McMorris and Barbadian bowler David Holford, led the tournament in runs and wickets, respectively.

Teams

Points table

Key

 W – Outright win (12 points)
 L – Outright loss (0 points)
 LWF – Loss, but won first innings (4 points)

 DWF – Drawn, but won first innings (6 points)
 DLF – Drawn, and lost first innings (2 points)
 P – Overall points

Fixtures

Statistics

Most runs
The top five run-scorers are included in this table, listed by runs scored and then by batting average.

Most wickets

The top five wicket-takers are listed in this table, listed by wickets taken and then by bowling average.

References

West Indian cricket seasons from 1945–46 to 1969–70
Domestic cricket competitions in 1965–66
1966 in West Indian cricket
Regional Four Day Competition seasons